Misleydis Compañy (born April 6, 1982 in Granma) is a female fencer from Cuba. She competed for her native country at the 2008 Summer Olympics in the foil competition, and won three medals at the 2007 Pan American Games.

References
 sports-reference

1982 births
Living people
Cuban female sabre fencers
Olympic fencers of Cuba
Fencers at the 2007 Pan American Games
Fencers at the 2008 Summer Olympics
Pan American Games gold medalists for Cuba
Pan American Games bronze medalists for Cuba
Pan American Games medalists in fencing
Medalists at the 2007 Pan American Games
Cuban female foil fencers
People from Granma Province
21st-century Cuban women
20th-century Cuban women
20th-century Cuban people